The 2010 congressional elections in Arkansas were held on November 2, 2010, to determine who would represent Arkansas in the United States House of Representatives.  Arkansas has four seats in the House, apportioned according to the 2000 United States Census. Representatives are elected for two-year terms; those elected served in the 112th Congress from January 3, 2011 until January 3, 2013. None of Arkansas's four representatives faced major party opposition in 2008. , this was the last election in which a Democrat won a congressional district in Arkansas or managed 40% or more of the House popular vote in the state.

Overview 
The table below shows the total number and percentage of votes, as well as the number of seats gained and lost by each political party in the election for the United States House of Representatives in Arkansas.

By district
Results of the 2010 United States House of Representatives elections in Arkansas by district:

District 1

 
This was an open seat, as Democratic incumbent Marion Berry retired.

Berry had always been reelected in this district by a wide margin since his first reelection campaign in 1998, and was unopposed in 2008. The district was very Republican (giving only 38% to Obama) on a national level despite a long history of electing Democrats to local and state level offices.
 
AR - District 1 from OurCampaigns.com
Campaign Contributions from OpenSecrets
2010 Arkansas- 1st District from CQ Politics
Race profile at The New York Times

Democrat
Chad Causey, attorney and chief of staff for Marion Berry

Republican
Rick Crawford, businessman

Green
Kenton Adler (campaign site, PVS)

Polling

Results

District 2

 
This district was represented by seven term Democrat Vic Snyder who was unchallenged in 2008 and received 70% of the vote. Snyder announced that he would retire in 2010, reportedly after polls showed him trailing Republican Tim Griffin.
AR - District 2 from OurCampaigns.com
Campaign Contributions from OpenSecrets
2010 Alabama - 2nd District from CQ Politics
Race profile at The New York Times

Democrat
Joyce Elliott, State Senator

Republican
Timothy Griffin, U.S. Attorney

Polling

Results

District 3

This district was represented by Republican John Boozman. Boozman has  formally announced his 2010 plans for the U.S. Senate, against Blanche Lincoln.  The district (comprising the northwest part of the state) has been held by the GOP since 1966.
AR - District 3 from OurCampaigns.com
Campaign Contributions from OpenSecrets
2010 Arkansas - 3rd District from CQ Politics
Race profile at The New York Times

Democrat
David Whitaker (campaign site, PVS), attorney

Republican
Steve Womack, Mayor of Rogers

Independent
Jerry Coon

Polling

Results

District 4

This district was represented by Democrat Mike Ross. Ross ran for re-election.
AR - District 4 from OurCampaigns.com
Campaign Contributions from OpenSecrets
2010 Alabama - 4th District from CQ Politics
Race profile at The New York Times

Democrat
Mike Ross, incumbent U.S. Representative

Republican
Beth Anne Rankin (campaign site, PVS), teacher and former Miss Arkansas

Green Party
Josh Drake

Polling

Results

See also
Arkansas elections, 2010
Opinion polling for the United States House of Representatives elections, 2010#Arkansas

References

External links
Elections at the Arkansas Secretary of State
Official candidate lists
U.S. Congress candidates for Arkansas at Project Vote Smart
Arkansas U.S. House from OurCampaigns.com
Campaign contributions for U.S. Congressional races in Arkansas from OpenSecrets
2010 Arkansas General Election graph of multiple polls from Pollster.com

House - Arkansas from the Cook Political Report

 Arkansas 2010 Midterm Elections, Green Papers - Complete list of current and withdrawn candidates
 Imagine Election - Look up which district you live in, and who is running for office there.  Search by address or zip code.

House of Representatives
Arkansas
2010